The Gaffer is an ITV situation comedy series of the early 1980s, that starred Bill Maynard and was written by businessman Graham White. It was made for the ITV network by Yorkshire Television.

Cast
 Bill Maynard –  Fred Moffatt
 Russell Hunter – Harry
 Pat Ashton – Betty
 David Gillies – Ginger
 Don Crann – Charlie
 Keith Marsh – Henry 
 Chris Langham – Spencer Moffatt (series 2)

Plot
Following the end of the situation comedy (Oh No It's Selwyn Froggitt), Maynard's next character couldn't have been more different from the bumbling Selwyn Froggitt. Fred Moffatt is a survivor – just. Bearded, wearing a battered hat and a crumpled suit, his Rover P6 a rusting wreck, he runs a struggling engineering firm and is constantly trying to avoid his creditors, the tax man, the bank manager, and indeed anyone who might want him to pay for something.

The series' background accurately reflected the precarious condition of many small businesses of the era and added a dark undercurrent to the situation comedy. Unlike the physical comedy of Selwyn Froggitt, the scripts for The Gaffer were wordy and sardonic and the plots relatively complex, with Fred Moffatt usually managing to outwit at least some of the people who were chasing him for money.

The cast included Russell Hunter as the radical union shop steward whose interest was in parting Moffatt from as much money as possible to better pay his members, and Pat Ashton as his ineffectual secretary Betty.

Abrupt End 
The third and final series (broadcast 1983) saw Moffatt elected to the local council, extending his struggles to local politics. But, disgruntled with the losing battle he was fighting, in the final episode ("Goodbye"), Moffatt upped sticks, sold off the business to his employees and emigrated to Australia to make a new start, only to return and take back the business after having attended his son Spencer's wedding.  However the series thus ended abruptly, despite its success, after a two-year run.

In later years, it was suggested that during the production of series 3, White (the creator of the show) protested that Maynard kept changing his scripts too much, thus embittering the relationship between the two and so a planned fourth series was cancelled.  White revealed details of the dispute which ended the series in a 2014 newspaper interview .  Graham White published a sequel novel entitled "The Gaffer's Guerillas" which takes the story into the present day .

Home media
All three series of The Gaffer have been released on DVD by Network, A 3-disc set of the complete series has also been released.

See also
 Cowboys

External links
 

Television series by Yorkshire Television
ITV sitcoms
1980s British sitcoms
1981 British television series debuts
1983 British television series endings
Television shows set in Leeds
Television shows set in Yorkshire
English-language television shows